The 2022–23 Ohio University Bobcats men's basketball team represented Ohio University for the 2022–23 NCAA Division I men's basketball season. The Bobcats were led by fourth-year head coach Jeff Boals, who was a 1995 graduate of Ohio University. They played their home games at the Convocation Center in Athens, Ohio as a member of the Mid-American Conference.

Ohio started the season slow after key player losses from the prior year.  They also started conference play slowly with several difficult road games in January.  They recovered in February and won seven out of their last nine regular season games to head into the MAC tournament at 18–13 as the fifth seed with a 10–8 conference record.  They defeated Ball State in the first round of the MAC tournament before losing to top-seeded Toledo to finish 19–14.

Previous season

The Bobcats finished the 2021–22 season 25–10 and 14–6 in MAC play to finish in third place. As the No. 3 seed in the MAC tournament, they defeated Ball State before losing to Kent State in the semi-finals. They received a bid to the CBI.  There they defeated Rice in the first round before losing to Abilene Christian in the second round.

Offseason

Ohio had a lot of roster turnover.  Eleven of the sixteen players that had minutes the prior season either graduated, left the team, or transferred.  Three key starters had to be replaced.  Jason Carter graduated while Ben Vander Plas and Mark Sears transferred to high-major programs.  Dwight Wilson III redshirted last season due to injury and returned for his senior year.

Coaching Staff Changes

Coaching Additions

Departures

 Walk-on in 2021-22

Incoming transfers

Recruiting class

Walk-on

Preseason
On October 26, 2022 the MAC released the preseason coaches poll. Ohio was picked to finish fifth in the MAC regular season. Ohio had no members on the preseason all-MAC teams

Preseason rankings

MAC Tournament Champions: Kent State (4), Toledo (4), Akron (2), Eastern Michigan (1), Western Michigan (1)

Source

Roster

Support Staff 

Source:

Schedule and results

|-
!colspan=9 style=|Exhibition

|-
!colspan=9 style=|Non-conference regular season

|-
!colspan=9 style=| MAC regular season

|-
!colspan=9 style=| MAC Tournament

Source

Statistics

Team Statistics
Final 2022–23 Statistics

Source

Player statistics

Source

Team and individual highs

Team Game Highs

Individual Game Highs

Source

Awards and honors

Weekly Awards

All-MAC Awards 

Source

References

Ohio Bobcats men's basketball seasons
Ohio
Ohio Bobcats men's basketball
Ohio Bobcats men's basketball